Division No. 4, Subdivision A is an unorganized subdivision on the Southwest coast of the island of Newfoundland in Newfoundland and Labrador, Canada. It is in Division No. 4.
According to the 2006 Statistics Canada Census:

Population: 1700
% Change (2011 to 2016): -6.1%
Dwellings: 1375
Area: 1217.94 km2-14.4
Density: 1.4 people/km2

Division No. 4, Subdivision A includes the unincorporated communities of
 Codroy
 Millville
 South Branch
 St. Andrew's
 Upper Ferry

References

Newfoundland and Labrador subdivisions